The Lone Pine Film Festival is an annual film festival held in Lone Pine, California, which celebrates the hundreds of films and television episodes that used Lone Pine, the Alabama Hills, and the nearby Sierra Nevada mountain range as film locations. Since the early years of filmmaking, directors and their production units have used the Lone Pine area to represent the iconic American West. Since The Roundup (1920), the first documented film produced in the area, Lone Pine has played host to hundreds of the industry's best known directors and actors, among them directors William Wyler, John Ford, George Stevens, and William Wellman, and actors John Wayne, Gene Autry, Roy Rogers, Bing Crosby, and Barbara Stanwyck. The festival at Lone Pine was held for the first time in 1990, then called the Sierra Film Festival. In 2019, the festival celebrated its thirtieth anniversary. Held annually over the Indigenous Peoples' Day weekend, the Lone Pine Film Festival is one of the most important Western film festivals in the United States. The festival is the only film fan gathering in the world which is held on location where the movies were shot.

History
The Lone Pine area was first used as a film location in 1920, when a movie production company came to the Alabama Hills to make the silent film The Round-Up. Other companies soon discovered the scenic location, and in the coming decades, over 400 films, 100 television episodes, and countless commercials used Lone Pine and the Alabama Hills as a film location. Some of the notable films shot here in the 1920s and 1930s include Riders of the Purple Sage (1925) with Tom Mix, The Enchanted Hill (1926) with Jack Holt, Somewhere in Sonora (1927) with Ken Maynard, Blue Steel (1934) with John Wayne, Hop-Along Cassidy (1935) with William Boyd, The Charge of the Light Brigade (1936) with Errol Flynn, Oh, Susanna! (1936) with Gene Autry, Rhythm on the Range (1936) with Bing Crosby, The Cowboy and the Lady (1938) with Gary Cooper, Under Western Stars (1938) with Roy Rogers, and Gunga Din (1939) with Cary Grant.

In the coming decades, Lone Pine and the Alabama Hills continued to be used as the setting for Western films, including West of the Pecos (1945) with Robert Mitchum, Thunder Mountain (1947) with Tim Holt, The Gunfighter (1950) with Gregory Peck, The Nevadan (1950) with Randolph Scott, Bad Day at Black Rock (1955) with Spencer Tracy, Hell Bent for Leather (1960) with Audie Murphy, How the West Was Won (1962) with James Stewart, Nevada Smith (1966) with Steve McQueen, Joe Kidd (1972) with Clint Eastwood, Maverick (1994) with Mel Gibson, and The Lone Ranger (2013) with Johnny Depp. Through the years, non-Western films also used the unique landscape of the area, including Alfred Hitchcock's Saboteur (1942) with Robert Cummings, Samson and Delilah (1949) with Hedy Lamarr, Star Trek V: The Final Frontier (1989) with William Shatner, Tremors (1990) with Kevin Bacon, The Postman (1997) with Kevin Costner, and Gladiator (2000) with Russell Crowe.

In 1989, Lone Pine business and community leaders developed a plan to celebrate the film industry's heritage of using Lone Pine and the surrounding area as film locations to represent the iconic American West. They invited numerous actors, directors, and producers who made films in the area throughout the years. The first film festival in Lone Pine was held on October 6 and 7 and was called the Sierra Film Festival. Co-sponsored by a number of individuals and businesses, that first festival included numerous Western film celebrities, including Roy Rogers, Richard Farnsworth, Rand Brooks, Pierce Lyden, Loren Janes, William Witney, and former stuntman Joe Yrigoyen. The festival acknowledging its "deep appreciation and great gratitude" to Roy Rogers, who made his first film in Lone Pine in 1938 with Under Western Stars. Rogers dedicated an historical stone marker placed at Whitney Portal and Movie Road during the festival. The bronze plaque on the stone reads: "Sierra Film Festival, 70 years of Movie History, October 6 & 7, 1990, Movie Flats – Lone Pine".

Events
The Lone Pine Film Festival takes place annually over the Columbus Day weekend, the second weekend of October. The festival opens at the Lone Pine Film History Museum on Thursday night for a gala reception. Over the next three days, a variety of events take place, including:
 Guided tours into the Alabama Hills to notable film locations (by car caravan)
 Film screenings
 Guest speakers and panels
 Sunrise photo tours and cowboy poetry
 Wild West shows
 Rodeo shows
 Sunday afternoon parade of celebrities
 Sunday night closing campfire

Festivals

See also
 Alabama Hills
 List of films shot in Lone Pine

References

External links
 Lone Pine Film Festival official website
 Lone Pine Film History Museum official website

Film festivals in California
Tourist attractions in Inyo County, California
October events
Film festivals established in 1990